Miziya Peak is the 604 m summit of Vidin Heights on Varna Peninsula, eastern Livingston Island in the South Shetland Islands, Antarctica.  The peak overlooks Kaliakra Glacier to the south, and Saedinenie Snowfield to the northwest. First ascent by Lyubomir Ivanov from Camp Academia on 25 December 2004, as part of Tangra 2004/05 survey.

The peak is named after the Bulgarian town of Miziya in relation to the ancient Thracian province of Miziya (Moesia).

Location

Maps
 L.L. Ivanov et al. Antarctica: Livingston Island and Greenwich Island, South Shetland Islands. Scale 1:100000 topographic map. Sofia: Antarctic Place-names Commission of Bulgaria, 2005.
 L.L. Ivanov. Antarctica: Livingston Island and Greenwich, Robert, Snow and Smith Islands. Scale 1:120000 topographic map.  Troyan: Manfred Wörner Foundation, 2009.  
 L.L. Ivanov. Antarctica: Livingston Island and Smith Island. Scale 1:100000 topographic map. Manfred Wörner Foundation, 2017. 
 A. Kamburov and L. Ivanov. Bowles Ridge and Central Tangra Mountains: Livingston Island, Antarctica. Scale 1:25000 map. Sofia: Manfred Wörner Foundation, 2023.

References
 Miziya Peak. SCAR Composite Antarctic Gazetteer
 Bulgarian Antarctic Gazetteer. Antarctic Place-names Commission. (details in Bulgarian, basic data in English)
 L.L. Ivanov, Livingston Island: Tangra Mountains, Komini Peak, west slope new rock route; Lyaskovets Peak, first ascent; Zograf Peak, first ascent; Vidin Heights, Melnik Peak, Melnik Ridge, first ascent, The American Alpine Journal, 2005, 312–315. ISSN 0065-6925
 Antarctica: Livingston Island, Climb Magazine, Issue 14, Kettering, UK, April 2006, pp. 89-91.

External links
 Miziya Peak. Copernix satellite image

Mountains of Livingston Island